Cârligi may refer to several villages in Romania:

 Cârligi, a village in Filipești Commune, Bacău County
 Cârligi, a village in Ştefan cel Mare Commune, Neamţ County

See also 
 Cârlig (disambiguation)
 Cârligei (disambiguation)
 Cârligu River (disambiguation)
 Cârligele River (disambiguation)
Carlini (name)